Frog Creek may refer to the following places in the United States:

 Frog Creek, Wisconsin, a town
 Frog Creek (Florida), a park
 Frog Creek (Oregon), a stream
 Frog Creek (West Virginia), a stream
 Frog Creek, Pennsylvania, a fictional town in the Magic Tree House children's book series

See also

 Creek frog (disambiguation)
 Frog Mortar Creek